Himantolophus nigricornis is a species of footballfish, a type of anglerfish. The fish is bathypelagic and is endemic to the central Pacific Ocean.

References

Himantolophidae
Deep sea fish
Fish described in 1988